was a river gunboat of the Imperial Japanese Navy, part of the 11th Gunboat Sentai, that operated on the Yangtze River in China during the 1930s, and during the Second Sino-Japanese War. Participated in the Battle of Wuhan, June-Sept., 1938. Participated in Battle of Madang and Battle of Jiujiang, June, 1938. Nanchang Campaign: February–May, 1939. 1942: In service as passenger ship. Sunk May 31, 1944 on the Yangtze River while serving as a communications ship.

Footnotes

Bibliography 
The Maru Special, Japanese Naval Vessels No.53, Japanese support vessels,  (Japan), July 1981
Daiji Katagiri, Ship Name Chronicles of the Imperial Japanese Navy Combined Fleet, Kōjinsha (Japan), June 1988, 
, National Archives of Japan
Reference code: A09050130100, Explanatory document on addition of fiscal 1929 estimated expense in 56th Diet
Reference code: C05021206200, Inquiry, Response, Notification (6)
Reference code: C05022903500, Military Affairs 1, No. 88 June 21, 1933, Traffic ship, Kotaka
Reference code: C05021645000, No. 2026 June 15, 1931 Sasebo Navy Arsenal No.10-26, Establishing part of equipment for traffic ship Kotaka

Sources 
 Japanese gunboats (with photos) 
 Vessels of the IJN
  Monograph 144 Chapter II

Gunboats of the Imperial Japanese Navy
Second Sino-Japanese War naval ships of Japan
Maritime incidents in May 1944
Shipwrecks of China
Ships built by Mitsui Engineering and Shipbuilding